Vacchellia is a monotypic genus of  running crab spiders containing the single species, Vacchellia baltoroi. It was first described by Lodovico di Caporiacco in 1935, and is only found in Karakorum.

See also
 List of Philodromidae species

References

Monotypic Araneomorphae genera
Philodromidae
Spiders of Asia